The 2019–20 EHF Champions League knockout stage was scheduled to begin on 18 March with the round of 16 and end on 31 May 2020 with the final at the Lanxess Arena in Cologne, Germany, to decide the winners of the 2019–20 EHF Champions League. A total of 14 teams would have competed in the knockout phase, including the top six teams from Groups A and B and the two winners of the playoffs between the top two teams from Groups C and D.

On 25 March, the EHF announced that no matches would be played before June due to the COVID-19 pandemic. Afterwards, it was decided just to play the final four.

Format
In the round of 16, the ten teams ranked 2nd–6th in Groups A and B plus the two winners from the playoffs between the top two teams from Groups C and D play against each other in two-legged home-and-away matches. The six winning teams advance to the quarterfinals, where they are joined by the winners of Groups A and B for another round of two-legged home-and-away matches. The four quarterfinal winners qualify for the final four tournament at the Lanxess Arena in Cologne, Germany.

Qualified teams
The top six teams from Groups A and B and the two playoff winners qualify for the knockout stage.

Round of 16
On 13 March 2020, the EHF announced that the round of 16 matches would not be held as scheduled due to the ongoing coronavirus pandemic in Europe. A new competition schedule proposed by the EHF on 25 March foresees the first and second legs being played in the first week of June, with a cancellation deadline on 15 May. The matches were cancelled on 24 April 2020.

Overview

|}

Matches

Quarterfinals
The quarterfinals were rescheduled on 25 March 2020. The matches were cancelled on 24 April 2020.

Overview

|}

Matches

Final four
The final four was scheduled to be held at the Lanxess Arena in Cologne, Germany on 30 and 31 May but was rescheduled to 22 and 23 August 2020, and later to 28 and 29 December 2020. Because of the cancellation of the last 16 and quarterfinals, the first two-placed teams from the group stage groups will play in the final four. The draw was held on 10 November 2020.

Bracket

Semifinals

Third place game

Final

Notes

References

External links
Final4 Official website

knockout stage